The North Brookfield Town House is a historic municipal building at 185 N. Main Street in North Brookfield, Massachusetts.  The -story wood-frame building was built in 1864 to a design by E. Boyden & Son.  The building is located prominently in the center of North Brookfield's commercial district, and is distinguished by the  tower at the corner of North Main and Summer Streets.  The building is richly decorated with Italianate and French Second Empire styling.  It is the town's third town hall.

The building was listed on the National Register of Historic Places in 2001.

See also
National Register of Historic Places listings in Worcester County, Massachusetts

References

City and town halls on the National Register of Historic Places in Massachusetts
Buildings and structures in Worcester County, Massachusetts
Residential buildings completed in 1864
North Brookfield, Massachusetts
National Register of Historic Places in Worcester County, Massachusetts
Town halls in Massachusetts